ESPN College Football Countdown on ABC (branded for sponsorship purposes as ESPN College Football Countdown on ABC presented by Walmart) is a college football television show that typically airs at 3:00 PM on Saturday afternoons during football season on ABC. The programs precedes game action on the network and has ever since 1981.

Hosts

Jim Lampley: (1981–1987)
Al Trautwig: (1988)
Roger Twibell: (1989–1991)
John Saunders: (1992–2015)
Stan Verrett: (2016)
Kevin Negandhi: (2017 – present)

Analysts

Beano Cook: (1982–1985)
Bo Schembechler: (1991)
Todd Blackledge: (1996–1998)
Terry Bowden: (1999–2003)
Craig James: (2003–2008)
Aaron Taylor: (2004–2005)
Doug Flutie: (2006–2008)
Jesse Palmer: (2009–2013)
Mack Brown: (2014–2018)
Danny Kanell: (2014)
Mark May: (2015–2016)
Booger McFarland: (2017, 2020–present)
Jonathan Vilma: (2018–2019)
Mark Sanchez: (2019–2020)

References

College Football personalities
1981 American television series debuts
1990s American television series
2000s American television series
2010s American television series
American Broadcasting Company original programming
College football studio shows
Sports telecast series